The Hallidie Building is an office building in the Financial District of San Francisco, California, at 130 Sutter Street, between Montgomery Street and Kearny Street. Designed by architect Willis Polk and named in honor of San Francisco cable car pioneer Andrew Smith Hallidie, it opened in 1918. Though credited as the first American building to feature glass curtain walls, it was in fact predated by Louis Curtiss's Boley Clothing Company building in Kansas City, Missouri, completed in 1909.

The building underwent a two-year restoration, completed in April 2013, after its sheet metal friezes, cornices, balconies, and fire escapes were deemed unsafe by the City of San Francisco's Department of Building Inspection.

The San Francisco chapter of the American Institute of Architects has its offices in the Hallidie Building and is renovating the concrete street-level retail space, which predates the rest of the building, to add a gallery, lecture hall, and cafe, to open in 2021. The building also houses AIGA, the Center for Architecture + Design, Charles M. Salter Associates, Inc., and Coordinated Resources, Inc.

See also
List of San Francisco Designated Landmarks

References

External links
Photos of the Hallidie Building at aiasf.org
Hallidie Building at greatbuildings.com

Financial District, San Francisco
Office buildings completed in 1918
Office buildings in San Francisco
Commercial buildings on the National Register of Historic Places in California
Historic American Buildings Survey in California
National Register of Historic Places in San Francisco
San Francisco Designated Landmarks
Modernist architecture in California
Chicago school architecture in California